Carter Harrison may refer to:

 Carter Harrison, Sr. (1825–1893), mayor of Chicago, 1879–1887 & 1893
 Carter Harrison, Jr. (1860–1953), mayor of Chicago, 1897–1905 & 1911–1915
 Carter Bassett Harrison (c.1756–1808), U.S. Representative from Virginia
 Carter Henry Harrison I (~1727  – 1793/1794), member of the Virginia House of Delegates